The Black Moods are an American rock band from Tempe, Arizona. The band consists of vocalist and guitarist Josh Kennedy, bassist Jordan Hoffman and drummer Chico Diaz. They have appeared frequently on The Bob and Tom Show. Kennedy and Diaz were previously in a band called Chalmers Green, with brothers Kevin Michael Prier (lead vocals) and Ryan Prier (bass). Kennedy and the Prier brothers all hail from Wheaton, Missouri.

Discography

Studio albums 
 The Black Moods (2012)
 Medicine (2016)
 Sunshine (2020)
 Into the Night (2022)

Singles

References

External links
 

Rock music groups from Arizona
Musical groups from Tempe, Arizona
American musical trios